The Kingdom of the Burgundians or First Kingdom of Burgundy was established by Germanic Burgundians in the Rhineland and then in eastern Gaul in the 5th century.

History

Background
The Burgundians, a Germanic tribe, may have migrated from the Scandinavian island of Bornholm to the Vistula basin in the 3rd century AD. However, the first documented King of the Burgundians, Gjúki (Gebicca), lived in the late 4th century east of the Rhine.

In 406 the Alans, Vandals, Suevi, and possibly the Burgundians, crossed the Rhine and invaded Roman Gaul. The Burgundians settled as foederati in the Roman province of Germania Secunda along the Middle Rhine.

Kingdom
In 411 AD, the Burgundian king Gunther (or Gundahar or Gundicar) in cooperation with Goar, king of the Alans, set up Jovinus as a puppet emperor. Apparently as part of a truce, the Emperor Honorius later officially "granted" them the land. Olympiodorus of Thebes also mentions a Guntiarios who was called "commander of the Burgundians" in the context of the 411 usurping of Germania Secunda by Jovinus.

Gunther was killed in the fighting, reportedly along with the majority of the Burgundians. The campaign was the origin of the mediæval  poem.

Gunther was succeeded as king by Gunderic (or Gundioc or Gondioc) in 437. Their efforts to enlarge their kingdom down the Rhone river brought them into conflict with the Visigothic Kingdom in the south. In 451, Gunderic joined forces with Aetius against Attila, leader of the Huns, in the Battle of the Catalaunian Plains.

When Gunderic died in 473, his kingdom was divided among his four sons: Gundobad (473–516 in Lyon, king of all of Burgundy from 480), Chilperic II (473–493 in Valence), Gundomar/Godomar (473–486 in Vienne) and Godegisel (473–500, in Vienne and Geneva).

After the fall of the Western Roman Empire in 476, King Gundobad allied with the mighty Frankish king Clovis I against the threat of the Ostrogothic king, Theoderic the Great. Later, when Rome was no longer able to afford protection to the inhabitants of Gaul, the Sequani became merged in the newly formed Kingdom of Burgundy.

According to Gregory of Tours (538–594), in 493 Gundobad slew his brother Chilperic II and exiled his daughter Clotilde, who was married to the Merovingian Clovis, King of the Franks, who had just conquered northern Gaul. The decline of the kingdom began when they came under attack from their former Frankish allies. In 523, the sons of King Clovis campaigned in the Burgundian lands, instigated by their mother Clotilde, in revenge for Gundobad's murder of her father. In 532, the Burgundians were decisively defeated by the Franks at the Battle of Autun, whereafter King Godomar was killed and Burgundy incorporated into the Frankish kingdom in 534.

List of kings
Gebicca (late 4th century – c. 407)
Gundomar I (c. 407 – 411), son of Gebicca
Giselher (c. 407 – 411), son of Gebicca
Gunther (c. 407 – 436), son of Gebicca

Flavius Aëtius moves the Burgundians into Sapaudia (Upper Rhône Basin).

Gunderic/Gundioc (436–473) opposed by
Chilperic I, brother of Gundioc (443–c. 480) 
division of the kingdom among the four sons of Gundioc:
Gundobad (473–516 in Lyon, king of all of Burgundy from 480),
Chilperic II (473–493 in Valence) 
Gundomar/Godomar (473–486 in Vienne) 
Godegisel (473–500, in Vienne and Geneva)
Sigismund, son of Gundobad (516–524)
Godomar II or Gundimar, son of Gundobad (524–532)

References

Sources

Bury, J.B. The Invasion of Europe by the Barbarians. London: Macmillan and Co., 1928.
Dalton, O.M. The History of the Franks, by Gregory of Tours. Oxford: The Clarendon Press, 1927.
Drew, Katherine Fischer.  The Burgundian Code.  Philadelphia: University of Pennsylvania Press, 1972.
Gordon, C.D. The Age of Attila. Ann Arbor: University of Michigan Press, 1961.
Guichard, Rene, Essai sur l'histoire du peuple burgonde, de Bornholm (Burgundarholm) vers la Bourgogne et les Bourguignons, 1965, published by A. et J. Picard et Cie.
Murray, Alexander Callander. From Roman to Merovingian Gaul. Broadview Press, 2000.
Musset, Lucien. The Germanic Invasions: The Making of Europe AD 400-600. University Park, Pennsylvania: The Pennsylvania State University Press, 1975.
Nerman, Birger. Det svenska rikets uppkomst. Generalstabens litagrafiska anstalt: Stockholm. 1925.
Rivers, Theodore John.  Laws of the Salian and Ripuarian Franks.  New York: AMS Press, 1986.
Rolfe, J.C., trans, Ammianus Marcellinus. Cambridge, Massachusetts: Harvard University Press, 1950.
Shanzer, Danuta. ‘Dating the Baptism of Clovis.’ In Early Medieval Europe, volume 7, pages 29–57. Oxford: Blackwell Publishers Ltd, 1998.
Shanzer, D. and I. Wood.  Avitus of Vienne: Letters and Selected Prose.  Translated with an Introduction and Notes.  Liverpool: Liverpool University Press, 2002.
Werner, J. (1953). "Beiträge zur Archäologie des Attila-Reiches", Die Bayerische Akademie der Wissenschaft. Abhandlungen. N.F. XXXVIII A Philosophische-philologische und historische Klasse. Münche
Wood, Ian N. ‘Ethnicity and the Ethnogenesis of the Burgundians’. In Herwig Wolfram and Walter Pohl, editors, Typen der Ethnogenese unter besonderer Berücksichtigung der Bayern, volume 1, pages 53–69. Vienna: Denkschriften der Österreichische Akademie der Wissenschaften, 1990.
Wood, Ian N. The Merovingian Kingdoms. Harlow, England: The Longman Group, 1994.

411 establishments
States and territories established in the 410s
States and territories disestablished in the 530s
 
 
5th century in sub-Roman Gaul
5th century in Switzerland
Former countries in Europe
534 disestablishments
Barbarian kingdoms